Scouting in Aruba shared a common history with the other Netherlands Antilles until the political separation of the island from the Netherlands. Scouting Aruba is a Full Member of the Interamerican Region of the World Organization of the Scout Movement.

Scouting Aruba consists of 13 groups, divided into 3 districts. There is one Scout group for people with mental and physical limitations.

Scouts in Aruba participate in many Caribbean camps, often traveling by boat to camp on nearby islands with Scouts from neighboring countries.

On 27 February 2016, the World Scout Committee recognized Scouting Aruba as the National Scout Organization of the Aruba and conferred it with Full WOSM Membership with voting rights. The membership certificate will be presented to the organization in the 41st World Scout Conference, which will be conducted in Baku of Azerbaijan in 2017.

Program and ideals
Beavers-ages 5 to 7 (boys and girls)
Cubs-ages 7 to 10 (mixed sections exist)
Scouts-ages 10 to 14 (mixed sections exist)
Explorers-ages 15 to 18 (boys and girls)
Rovers-ages 18 to 23 (boys and girls)

The Scout Motto is Be Prepared, Semper Prepara in Papiamento, and Weest Paraat in Dutch.

The Scouting Aruba emblem consists of Scouting symbols and colors corresponding with the flag of Aruba. The two five-point stars are taken off the Fleur-de-lis and placed upon each other. The logo is designed by Mr. Juan Martijn.

Promise

Beavers

(Dutch)

Ik beloof lief voor God en mijn land te zijn.

(Papiamento)

(English)

I promise to love God and my country.

Cubs

(Dutch)

Ik beloof mijn best te zullen doen. 
Mijn plicht te doen tegenover God en mijn land, 
de wet van de welpenhorde te gehoorzamen en iedere dag een goede daad te zullen doen .

(Papiamento)

(English)

I promise to do my best
to do my duty to God and my country
to keep the pack law
to do a good deed every day.

Scouts

(Dutch)

Op mijn erewoord beloof ik ernstig te zullen trachten
mijn plicht te doen tegen over God en mijn land, 
iedereen te helpen waar ik kan en de padvinderswet te gehoorzamen.

(Papiamento)

(English)

On my honor I promise that I will do my best 
to do my Duty to God and my country
to help other people at all time
and obey the scout law

Scout Law

Beavers
(Dutch)
Een bever heeft plezier, werkt hard en helpt zijn familie en vrienden.

(Papiamento)

(English)
A beaver plays with joy, works hard and helps his family and friends.

Cubs
(Dutch)
De welp volgt de oude wolf
De welp is moedig en houdt vol.

(Papiamento)

(English)
The Cub follows the wolf.
The Cub is honest, has courage and perseverance.

Scouts
(Dutch)
Een padvinder is eerlijk.
Een padvinder is trouw.
Een padvinder dient zich nuttig te maken en anderen te helpen.
Een padvinder is een vriend voor allen en een broeder voor alle andere padvinders.
Een padvinder is voorkomend en beleefd.
Een padvinder beschermt dieren en planten.
Een padvinder weet te gehoorzamen.
Een padvinder zet door alle omstandigheden.
Een padvinder is spaarzaam.
Een padvinder is rein in gedachten, woord en daad.

(Papiamento)

(English)
A Scout's honor is to be trusted.
A Scout is loyal.
A Scout is to be useful and to help others.
A Scout is a brother is every other scout.
A Scout is courteous.
A Scout protects animals and plants.
A Scout is obedient.
A Scout perseveres.
A Scout is thrifty.
A Scout is clean in his thoughts, words and deeds.

Explorers
(Dutch)
Op mijn erewoord beloof ik dat ik mij zodanig zal ontwikkelen zodat ik God beter kan lief hebben en dienen
Mijn medemensen kan respecteren en helpen
Mijn land ten dienste kan zijn
En mijn best te doen mij te houden aan het Huishoudelijk Reglement van mijn afdeling

(Papiamento)

(English)
On my honour I promise that I will develop my self so that I may love and serve God better.
To respect and help others.
To be in service of my country.
And to do my best to keep to the regulations of my crew.

See also
 Het Arubaanse Padvindsters Gilde

References

External links
 Official Homepage

World Organization of the Scout Movement member organizations
Scouting and Guiding on Aruba